
This is a list of Austrian inventors and discoverers. The following list comprises people from Austria, and also people of predominantly Austrian heritage, in alphabetical order of the surname.

A 
 Wilhelm Altekruse, inventor of Altekruse Puzzle

 Carl Auer von Welsbach, work on rare-earth elements, which led to the development of the flint used in modern lighters, the gas mantle which brought light to the streets of Europe in the late 19th century, and the development of the metal filament light bulb.

B 

 Georg Joseph Beer, introducing a flap operation for treatment of cataracts (Beer's operation), as well as popularizing the instrument used to perform the surgery (Beer's knife).
 Günther Burstyn, co-inventor of the tank (independent from him William Tritton and Walter Gordon Wilson)

C 
 Carl Cori (Nobel Prize), co-discovered Cori cycle.
 Gerty Cori (Nobel Prize), co-discovered Cori cycle.

D 
 Carl Djerassi, inventor of birth control pills
 Christian Doppler, discoverer of the Doppler effect

E 
 Paul Eisler, inventor of the printed circuit board.

F 

 Otto Frenzl: aeronautical pioneer, developed the area rule in 1943, a design technique for airfoils used to reduce an aircraft's drag at transonic and supersonic speeds. Later it was independently developed again by Richard T. Whitcomb in 1952.
 Sigmund Freud: neurologist who became known as the founding father of psychoanalysis
 Karl von Frisch: (Nobel Prize), one of the founders of modern ethology, studies on waggle dance
 Paul Fürst: inventor of the Mozartkugel

G 
 David Gestetner, inventor of the Gestetner stencil duplicator.
 Adolph Giesl-Gieslingen, inventor of the Giesl ejector

H 
 Friedrich Hayek (Nobel Prize), pioneering work in the theory of money and economic fluctuations.

 Victor Francis Hess (Nobel Prize), discovered cosmic ray.
 Ingeborg Hochmair, developed the first modern cochlear implant

I

J

K 

 Eric Kandel (Nobel Prize), research on the physiological basis of memory storage in neurons.
 Viktor Kaplan, inventor of the Kaplan turbine.
 Wolfgang von Kempelen, inventor of The Turk, a chess-playing automaton and Wolfgang von Kempelen's Speaking Machine.
 Walter Kohn (Nobel Prize) discovered Density functional theory
 Karl Kordesch, jointly co-inventor of Alkaline battery (together with Canadian Lewis Urry).
 Richard Kuhn (Nobel Prize), works on carotenoids and vitamins, co-discovered Soman

L 
 Hedy Lamarr, co-invented, with composer George Antheil, an early technique for spread spectrum communications and frequency hopping.

 Karl Landsteiner (Nobel Prize) discovered the main blood groups, co-discovered with Alexander S. Wiener, the Rhesus factor and co-discovered with  Constantin Levaditi and Erwin Popper the polio virus.

 Konrad Lorenz (Nobel Prize) one of the founders of modern ethology

M 
 Ferdinand Mannlicher, along with Scottish Canadian James Paris Lee, Mannlicher was particularly noted for inventing the en-bloc clip charger-loading magazine system.
 August Musger, inventor of slow motion.

N

O

P 

 Wolfgang Pauli (Nobel Prize), discovered Pauli exclusion principle
 Max Perutz (Nobel Prize), co-discovered with John Kendrew in studies the structures of hemoglobin and globular proteins.
 Fritz Pregl (Nobel Prize), making important contributions to quantitative organic microanalysis, one of which was the improvement of the combustion train technique for elemental analysis.

Q

R 
Edmund Rumpler, inventor of Rumpler Tropfenwagen

S 

 Franz Sacher, inventor of Sachertorte
 Erwin Schrödinger, discovered Schrödinger equation
 Eduard Suess: discoveries in geology, continent Gondwana and Tethys Ocean was named by Suess

T 
 Gustav Tauschek, inventor of Drum memory

U

V 
 Max Valier, performed the first test drive of a rocket car with liquid propulsion, the Valier-Heylandt Rak 7.

W 

 Julius Wagner-Jauregg (Nobel Prize), discovered treatment of mental disease by inducing a fever, an approach known as pyrotherapy.

X

Y

Z

See also
 List of Austrian Americans

Notes
Austrians have a history of aircraft and math

References

External links

!
Inventors and discoverers
Lists of inventors
Inventors